In the geometry of hyperbolic 4-space, the pentagrammic-order 600-cell honeycomb is one of four regular star-honeycombs. With Schläfli symbol {3,3,5,5/2}, it has five 600-cells around each face in a pentagrammic arrangement. It is dual to the small stellated 120-cell honeycomb. It can be considered the higher-dimensional analogue of the 4-dimensional icosahedral 120-cell and the 3-dimensional great dodecahedron. It is related to the order-5 icosahedral 120-cell honeycomb and great 120-cell honeycomb: the icosahedral 120-cells and great 120-cells in each honeycomb are replaced by the 600-cells that are their convex hulls, thus forming the pentagrammic-order 600-cell honeycomb.

This honeycomb can also be constructed by taking the order-5 5-cell honeycomb and replacing clusters of 600 5-cells meeting at a vertex with 600-cells. Each 5-cell belongs to five such clusters, and thus the pentagrammic-order 600-cell honeycomb has density 5.

See also 
 List of regular polytopes

References 
Coxeter, Regular Polytopes, 3rd. ed., Dover Publications, 1973. . (Tables I and II: Regular polytopes and honeycombs, pp. 294–296)
Coxeter, The Beauty of Geometry: Twelve Essays, Dover Publications, 1999  (Chapter 10: Regular honeycombs in hyperbolic space, Summary tables II,III,IV,V, p212-213)

Honeycombs (geometry)
5-polytopes